Berehove (from greek Kastròpolis, Καστρόπολις, "castle-city") is an urban-type settlement in the Yalta Municipality of the Autonomous Republic of Crimea, a territory recognized by a majority of countries as part of Ukraine and annexed by Russia as the Republic of Crimea.

Its population was 478 in the 2001 Ukrainian census. Current population:

References

External links
 
 http://rada.gov.ua/

Urban-type settlements in Crimea
Seaside resorts in Ukraine
Yalta Municipality